Favio Alejandro Durán (born 24 November 1995) is an Argentine footballer who plays for Olmedo.

References

External links
Profile at Vélez Sarsfield's official website 

Argentine footballers
1995 births
Living people
Club Atlético Vélez Sarsfield footballers
Villa Dálmine footballers
C.D. Olmedo footballers
Argentine Primera División players
Primera Nacional players
Ecuadorian Serie A players
Association football forwards
Expatriate footballers in Ecuador
People from Puerto Madryn